The eo ( or ) or tiger is a wooden percussion instrument carved in the shape of a tiger with a serrated back, played by running a bamboo whisk across it to mark the ends of sections. It is derived from the Chinese yu. On the back of the tiger is a Jeo-eo (저어) that looks like 27 saws. When the music stops, the performer knocks and scratches this Jeo-eo through the Jin and gives a signal.

References

External links 

Drums
Korean musical instruments
Asian percussion instruments
Musical instruments played with drum sticks
Unpitched percussion instruments
Korean traditional music